Hin Keng may refer to:
 Hin Keng Estate, a public housing estate in Tai Wai, Hong Kong
 Hin Keng station, an MTR rapid transit station adjacent to the estate